The FIBA Africa Championship 1992 was hosted by Egypt from December 28 to January 8, 1993.  The games were played in Cairo.  Angola won the tournament, the country's 2nd consecutive African championship, by beating Senegal in the final.

Competing Nations
The following national teams competed:

Preliminary rounds

Group A

Day 1

Day 2

Day 3

Day 4

Day 5

Group B

Day 1

Day 2

Day 3

Day 4

Day 5

Knockout stage

Classification Stage

Final standings

Awards

External links
 FIBA Archive

1992 in Egyptian sport
1992 in African basketball
AfroBasket
International basketball competitions hosted by Egypt
December 1992 sports events in Africa
January 1993 sports events in Africa